Nat Turner's Rebellion, historically known as the Southampton Insurrection, was a rebellion of enslaved Virginians that took place in Southampton County, Virginia, in August 1831. Led by Nat Turner, the rebels killed between 55 and 65 White people, making it the deadliest slave revolt in U.S. history. The rebellion was effectively suppressed within a few days, at Belmont Plantation on the morning of August 23, but Turner survived in hiding for more than two months afterward.

There was widespread fear amongst the White population in the aftermath of the rebellion. Militia and mobs killed as many as 120 enslaved people and freed African Americans in retaliation. After trials, the Commonwealth of Virginia executed 56 enslaved people accused of participating in the rebellion, including Turner himself; many Black people who had not participated were also persecuted in the frenzy. Because Turner was educated and was a preacher, Southern state legislatures subsequently passed new laws prohibiting the education of enslaved people and free Black people, restricting rights of assembly and other civil liberties for free Black people, and requiring White ministers to be present at all worship services.

Lonnie Bunch, director of the National Museum of African American History and Culture, said, "The Nat Turner rebellion is probably the most significant uprising in American history."

Turner's life

Nat Turner (October 2, 1800 – November 11, 1831) was an enslaved African-American preacher who organized and led the four-day rebellion of enslaved and free Black people in Southampton County, Virginia, in 1831. Turner was born into slavery in Southampton County, a rural plantation area with more Black people than White. Turner knew little about the background of his father, who was believed to have escaped from slavery when Turner was a child.

Benjamin Turner, the man who enslaved Nat and his family, called the infant Nat in his records. He was known simply as Nat but after the 1831 rebellion, he was widely referred to as Nat Turner. When Benjamin Turner died in 1810, his son Samuel Turner inherited Nat as property under the laws of the time, which made slavery legal.

Turner learned how to read and write at a young age. He was identified as having "natural intelligence and quickness of apprehension, surpassed by few." He grew up deeply religious and was often seen fasting, praying, or immersed in reading the stories of the Bible. He frequently had visions that he interpreted as messages from God, and which influenced his life.

At age 21, he escaped from Samuel Turner. After becoming delirious from hunger and receiving a vision that told him to "return to the service of my earthly master", he returned a month later. Turner married an enslaved woman named Cherry and had children. However, the family was separated after Samuel Turner's death in 1823; Nat was sold to Thomas Moore, and his wife and children were sold to Giles Reese.

In 1824, he had a second vision while working in the fields for Moore. In it, "the Saviour was about to lay down the yoke he had borne for the sins of men, and the great day of judgment was at hand".

Turner often conducted religious services, preaching the Bible to his fellow enslaved people who dubbed him "The Prophet". In addition to Blacks, Turner garnered White followers such as Etheldred T. Brantley, whom Turner was credited with having convinced to "cease from his wickedness".

By the spring of 1828, Turner was convinced that he "was ordained for some great purpose in the hands of the Almighty". He "heard a loud noise in the heavens" while working in Moore's fields on May 12 "and the Spirit instantly appeared to me and said the Serpent was loosened, and Christ had laid down the yoke he had borne for the sins of men, and that I should take it on and fight against the Serpent, for the time was fast approaching when the first should be last and the last should be first". Historian and theologian Joseph Dreis later wrote: "In connecting this vision to the motivation for his rebellion, Turner makes it clear that he sees himself as participating in the confrontation between God's Kingdom and the anti-Kingdom that characterized his social-historical context."

In 1830, Joseph Travis purchased Turner; Turner later recalled that he was "a kind master" who had "placed the greatest confidence" in him.

After the rebellion, a reward notice described him as:5 feet 6 or 8 inches [168–173 cm] high, weighs between 150 and 160 pounds [68–73 kg], rather "bright" [light-colored] complexion, but not a mulatto, broad shoulders, larger flat nose, large eyes, broad flat feet, rather knockneed [sic], walks brisk and active, hair on the top of the head very thin, no beard, except on the upper lip and the top of the chin, a scar on one of his temples, also one on the back of his neck, a large knot on one of the bones of his right arm, near the wrist, produced by a blow.Turner spent his entire life in Southampton County.

Preparations
Turner began communicating his plans to a small circle of trusted fellow slaves. "All his initial recruits were other slaves from his neighborhood". The neighborhood men had to find ways to communicate their intentions without revealing the plot. Songs may have tipped the neighborhood members to movements. "It is believed that one of the ways Turner summoned fellow conspirators to the woods was through the use of particular songs."

Turner eagerly anticipated God's signal to "slay my enemies with their own weapons". He began preparations for an uprising against the enslavers in Southampton County. Turner said, "I communicated the great work laid out to do, to four in whom I had the greatest confidence," fellow slaves Henry, Hark, Nelson, and Sam.

Rebellion 

Beginning in February 1831, Turner saw certain atmospheric conditions as a sign to begin preparations for a rebellion of slaves against their enslavers. On February 12, 1831, an annular solar eclipse was visible in Virginia and much of the southeastern United States. He believed the eclipse to be a sign that it was time to revolt. Turner envisioned this as a Black man's hand reaching over the sun.

Turner originally planned to begin the rebellion on Independence Day, July 4, 1831, but he had fallen ill and used the delay for additional planning with his co-conspirators. On August 13, an atmospheric disturbance made the Virginia sun appear bluish-green, possibly the result of a volcanic plume produced by the eruption of Ferdinandea Island off the coast of Sicily. Turner took this, like the eclipse months earlier, as a divine signal, and he began his rebellion a week later, on August 21.

Starting with several trusted fellow slaves, he ultimately enlisted more than seventy enslaved and free Blacks, some of whom were on horseback. The rebels traveled from house to house, freeing enslaved people and killing many of the White people whom they encountered.

Muskets and other firearms were too difficult to collect and would gather unwanted attention, so the rebels used knives, hatchets, and blunt instruments. The rebellion did not discriminate by age or sex and the rebels killed White men, women, and children. Nat Turner confessed to killing only one person, Margaret Whitehead, whom he killed with a blow from a fence post.

Historian Stephen B. Oates states that Turner called on his group to "kill all the white people". A newspaper noted, "Turner declared that 'indiscriminate slaughter was not their intention after they attained a foothold, and was resorted to in the first instance to strike terror and alarm.'" The group spared a few homes "because Turner believed the poor White inhabitants 'thought no better of themselves than they did of negroes.'" The Black rebels killed approximately sixty people before they were defeated by the state militia. The infantry defeated the insurrection with twice the manpower of the rebels, reinforced by three companies of artillery.

Turner thought that revolutionary violence would awaken the attitudes of Whites to the reality of the inherent brutality in slave-holding. Turner said he wanted to spread "terror and alarm" among Whites.

Retaliation

In Southampton County, Blacks suspected of participating in the rebellion were beheaded by the militia, and "their severed heads were mounted on poles at crossroads as a grisly form of intimidation". A local road (now Virginia State Route 658) was called as "Blackhead Signpost Road" in reference to these events.

Rumors quickly spread that the slave revolt was not limited to Southampton County and had spread as far south as Alabama. Fears led to reports in North Carolina that "armies" of enslaved people were seen on highways, and that they had burned and massacred the White inhabitants of Wilmington, North Carolina, and were marching on the state capital.

Such fear and alarm led to Whites attacking Blacks throughout the South with flimsy cause. The editor of the Richmond Whig described the scene as "the slaughter of many blacks without trial and under circumstances of great barbarity". White violence against Black people continued for two weeks after the rebellion had been suppressed. General Eppes ordered troops and White citizens to stop the killing:

He will not specify all the instances that he is bound to believe have occurred, but pass in silence what has happened, with the expression of his deepest sorrow, that any necessity should be supposed to have existed, to justify a single act of atrocity. But he feels himself bound to declare, and hereby announces to the troops and citizens, that no excuse will be allowed for any similar acts of violence, after the promulgation of this order.

Reverend G. W. Powell wrote a letter to the New York Evening Post stating that "many negroes are killed every day. The exact number will never be known." A company of militia from Hertford County, North Carolina, reportedly killed forty Blacks in one day and took $23 and a gold watch from the dead. Captain Solon Borland led a contingent from Murfreesboro, North Carolina, and he condemned the acts "because it was tantamount to theft from the White owners of the slaves".

Modern historians concur that the militias and mobs killed as many as 120 Black people, most of whom were not involved with the rebellion.

Capture 
Turner eluded capture for six weeks but remained in Southampton County. On October 30, a farmer named Benjamin Phipps discovered Turner hiding in a depression in the earth, created by a large, fallen tree covered with fence rails. This was referred to locally as Nat Turner's cave although it was not a natural cave.

While awaiting trial, Turner confessed his knowledge of the rebellion to attorney Thomas Ruffin Gray.

Trials and executions 
In the aftermath of the rebellion, dozens of suspected rebels were tried in courts called specifically to hear the cases against the enslaved people. Turner was tried on November 5, 1831, for "conspiring to rebel and making insurrection", and was convicted and sentenced to death. Asked if he regretted what he had done, he responded, "Was Christ not crucified?" Turner was hanged on November 11, 1831, in the county seat of Jerusalem, Virginia (now Courtland). According to some sources, he was beheaded as an example to frighten other would-be rebels.

Most of the trials of Turner's alleged conspirators took place in Southampton County, but some were held in neighboring Sussex County or other nearby counties. During their trial, most enslaved people were found guilty; only fifteen were acquitted. Of the thirty convicted, eighteen were hanged, while twelve were sold out of state. Of the five free Blacks tried for participation in the insurrection, one was hanged while the others were acquitted.

Human trophy collecting
After his execution, Turner's body was dissected and flayed, with his skin being used to make souvenir purses. In October 1897, Virginia newspapers ran a story about Nat Turner's skeleton being used as a medical specimen by Dr. H. U. Stephenson of Toana, Virginia. Stephenson acquired the skeleton from a son of Dr. S. B. Kellar; Dr. Kellar claimed to have paid Turner $10 for his body while he was in jail. After the execution, Kellar had Turner's bones scraped and hung as a medical specimen.

In 2002, a skull said to have been Turner's was given to Richard G. Hatcher, the former mayor of Gary, Indiana, for the collection of a civil rights museum he planned to build there. In 2016, Hatcher returned the skull to two of Turner's descendants. Since receiving the skull, the family has temporarily placed it with the Smithsonian Institution, where DNA testing will be done to determine whether it is the authentic remains of Nat Turner. If the test renders positive results, the family plans to bury his remains next to his descendants.

Another skull said to have been Turner's was contributed to the College of Wooster in Ohio upon its incorporation in 1866. When the school's only academic building burned down in 1901, the skull was saved by Dr. H. N. Mateer. Visitors recalled seeing a certificate, signed by a physician in Southampton County in 1866, that attested to the authenticity of the skull. The skull was eventually misplaced.

Legislative response

During the rebellion, Virginia legislators targeted free Blacks with a colonization bill, which allocated new funding to remove them to Africa, and a police bill that denied free Blacks trials by jury and made any free Blacks convicted of a crime subject to sale into slavery and relocation.

At least seven enslavers sent legislative petitions to Virginia's General Assembly for compensation for the loss of their enslaved people without trials during or immediately after the insurrection. They were all rejected.

The Virginia General Assembly debated the future of slavery the following spring. Some urged gradual emancipation, but the pro-slavery side prevailed after Virginia's leading intellectual, Thomas R. Dew, president of the College of William and Mary, published "a pamphlet defending the wisdom and benevolence of slavery, and the folly of its abolition". The General Assembly passed legislation making it unlawful to teach reading and writing to either enslaved or free Blacks and restricting all Blacks from holding religious meetings without the presence of a licensed White minister.

Other slave-holding states in the South enacted similar laws restricting activities of both enslaved and free Blacks. Across Virginia and other Southern states, legislators made it against the law for either Whites or Blacks to possess abolitionist publications. South Carolina built a series of arsenals to ensure weapons would be available in the event of another slave rebellion.

Aftermath

On September 3, 1831, William Lloyd Garrison published an article called "The Insurrection" in the abolitionist newspaper The Liberator. On September 10, 1831, The Liberator published excerpts from a letter to the editor saying that many people in the South believed the newspaper had a link to the revolt and that if Garrison were to go to the South, he "would not be permitted to live long...he would be taken away, and no one is the wiser for it...if Mr. Garrison were to go to the South, he would be dispatched immediately...[an] opinion expressed by persons at the South, repeatedly."

In November 1831, Thomas Ruffin Gray published The Confessions of Nat Turner. His work was derived partly from research Gray did while Turner was in hiding and partly from jailhouse conversations with Turner before trial. Gray's pamphlet sold 40,000 to 50,000 copies, making it a noted source about the rebellion at the time. However, a November 25, 1831, review of the publication by The Richmond Enquirer says:The pamphlet has one defect – we mean its style.  The confession of the culprit is given, as it were, from his own lips – (and when read to him, he admitted its statements to be correct) – but the language is far superior to what Nat Turner could have employed – Portions of it are even eloquently and classically expressed. – This is calculated to cast some shade of doubt over the authenticity of the narrative, and to give the Bandit a character for intelligence which he does not deserve, and ought not to have received. – In all other respects, the confession appears to be faithful and true.Gray's work is the primary historical document regarding Nat Turner but some modern historians, specifically David F. Allmendinger Jr., have also questioned the validity of his portrayal of Turner.

In the aftermath of the revolt, Whites did not try to interpret Turner's motives and ideas. Antebellum enslavers were shocked by the murders and had their fears of rebellions heightened; among them, Turner's name became "a symbol of terrorism and violent retribution." Northern states shared many of the fears shown by Southerners; a proposal to create a college for African Americans in New Haven, Connecticut was overwhelmingly rejected in what is now referred to as the New Haven Excitement.

The fear caused by Nat Turner's insurrection and the concerns raised in the emancipation debates that followed resulted in politicians and writers responding by defining slavery as a "positive good". Such authors included Thomas Roderick Dew, mentioned above. Other Southern writers began to promote a paternalistic ideal of improved Christian treatment of slaves, in part to avoid such rebellions. Dew and others believed that they were civilizing Black people (who by this stage were mostly American-born) through slavery. The writings were collected in The pro-slavery argument, as maintained by the most distinguished writers of the southern states (1853).

Other perspectives 
African Americans have generally regarded Turner as a hero of the resistance, who made enslavers pay for the hardships they had caused so many Africans and African Americans.

James H. Harris, who has written extensively about the history of the Black church, says that the revolt "marked the turning point in the black struggle for liberation." According to Harris, Turner believed that "only a cataclysmic act could convince the architects of a violent social order that violence begets violence."

In an 1843 speech at the National Negro Convention, Henry Highland Garnet, a formerly enslaved man and active abolitionist, described Nat Turner as "patriotic", saying that "future generations will remember him among the noble and brave."

In 1861, Thomas Wentworth Higginson, a Northern writer, praised Turner in a seminal article published in the Atlantic Monthly. He described Turner as a man "who knew no book but the Bible, and that by heart who devoted himself soul and body to the cause of his race."

In 1988, Turner was selected for inclusion in the Black Americans of Achievement biography series for children, with the book Nat Turner: Slave Revolt Leader by Terry Bisson. The book's introduction was written by Coretta Scott King.

Legacy
 The sword believed to have been used by Turner in the rebellion is kept in the Southampton County Courthouse, where there is a small display.
 In 1991, the Virginia Department of Historic Resources dedicated the "Nat Turner Insurrection" historic marker on Virginia Route 30, near Courtland, Virginia.
 In 2002, scholar Molefi Kete Asante listed Nat Turner as one of the 100 Greatest African Americans.
 In 2009, in Newark, New Jersey, the largest city-owned park was named Nat Turner Park. The facility cost $12 million in construction.
 In 2012, the small Bible that belonged to Turner was donated to the National Museum of African American History and Culture by the Person family of Southampton County, Virginia.
 In 2017, it was announced that Turner was to be honored with others with an Emancipation and Freedom Monument statue in Richmond, Virginia. Created by Thomas Jay Warren, the state-funded bronze sculpture was dedicated in September 2021.
 In December 2021, the Virginia Department of Cultural Resources dedicated the "Blackhead Signpost Road" historic marker.

In popular culture

Film 
 In 2003, Charles Burnett released the documentary Nat Turner: A Troublesome Property.
 The Birth of a Nation, the 2016 film starring, produced, and directed by Nate Parker, co-written with Jean McGianni Celestin, is about Turner's 1831 rebellion.

Literature 
 The Confessions of Nat Turner (1967), a novel by William Styron, won the Pulitzer Prize for Fiction in 1968. It prompted much controversy, with some criticizing a White author writing about such an important Black figure and calling him a racist for his portrayal of Turner as lusting for a White woman.
 In response to Styron's novel, ten African-American writers published a collection of essays, William Styron's The Confessions of Nat Turner: Ten Black Writers Respond (1968).
 In 2006, Kyle Baker's graphic novel, Nat Turner, received the Eisner Award for Best Reality-Based Work and the Glyph Comic Award for Best Story of the Year.
 Sharon Ewell Foster published her novel, The Resurrection of Nat Turner, Part One, The Witness, A Novel in 2011.

Music 
 The 1960s funk-soul band Nat Turner Rebellion was named after the slave revolt.
 Chance The Rapper's song "How Great" refers to Turner's rebellion in the line, "Hosanna Santa invoked and woke up enslaved people from Southampton to Chatham Manor."
 In the early 1990s, hip hop artist Tupac Shakur spoke in interviews about Nat Turner and his admiration for his spirit against oppression. Shakur also honored Turner with a cross tattoo on his back "EXODUS 1831", referring to the year Turner led the rebellion.
 The R.J. Phillips Band of Baltimore, Maryland, has written and recorded a song called "Nat Turner."

Theater 
 In 1940, Paul Peter's play, Nat Turner, was produced by the People's Drama Theater in New York City.
 In 2011, Paula Neiman's play, Following Faith: A Nat Turner Story was produced in Los Angeles.
 In 2016, the play Nat Turner in Jerusalem, by Nathan Alan Davis was produced at the New York Theatre Workshop, and in 2018 at the Forum Theatre in Washington, D.C.

See also

Denmark Vesey
 History of slavery in the United States
 John Brown (abolitionist)
List of incidents of civil unrest in the United States
 List of slaves

References
Notes

Further reading
 Aptheker, Herbert. Nat Turner's Slave Rebellion. New York: Humanities Press, 1966.
 Brodhead, Richard H. "Millennium, Prophecy and the Energies of Social Transformation: The Case of Nat Turner." in Imagining the End: Visions of Apocalypse from the Ancient Middle East to Modern America. A. Amanat and M. Bernhardsson, editors. London: I. B. Tauris, 2002. pp. 212–233. 
 Nishikawa, Kinohi. "The Confessions of Nat Turner." The Greenwood Encyclopedia of Multiethnic American Literature, 5 volumes. Emmanuel S. Nelson, ed. Westport: Greenwood Press, 2005. pp. 497–98. 
 Oates, Stephen B. The Fires of Jubilee: Nat Turner's Fierce Rebellion. New York: HarperPerennial, 1975. .

External links

 
 
 Breen, Patrick H. "Nat Turner's Revolt: Rebellion and Response in Southampton County, Virginia Ph.D. dissertation, University of Georgia, 2005.
 Breen, Patrick H. "We need more black memorials, but do we need Nat Turner's?" Salon, September 30, 2017.
 The Confessions of Nat Turner and Related Documents. Kenneth S. Greenberg, ed. Bedford Books, 1996
 Gibson, Christine. "Nat Turner: Lightning Rod", American Heritage
 "Interview with Sharon Ewell Foster regarding her recent research on Turner". The State of Things, North Carolina Public Radio, August 31, 2011.
 Harraway, Josh. Nat Turner Podcast March 1, 2018. (audiodrama)
 The Nat Turner Project. 
 "Nat Turner's Rebellion". Africans in America, PBS.org
 McElrath, Jessica. Nat Turner's Rebellion. About.com 
 "A Rebellion to Remember: Nat Turner". Documenting the American South, University of North Carolina at Chapel Hill.

Conflicts in 1831
1831 in Virginia
August 1831 events
19th-century rebellions
Rebellion
Slave rebellions in the United States
History of slavery in Virginia
Riots and civil disorder in Virginia
African-American history of Virginia